Mount Taylor Conservation Park is a protected area in the Australian state of South Australia located on Kangaroo Island in the gazetted locality of Newland. It was dedicated in 1970 primarily for the conservation of the rare triggerplant Stylidium tepperianum.

Description
It encompasses Mount Taylor, a large rounded hill. The conservation park's vegetation is mostly an open scrubland and heath of Eucalyptus diversifolia, E. baxteri and E. cosmophylla, over Acacia myrtifolia and Pultenaea aceroa. It contains small patches of E. leucoxylon / E. cladocalyx woodland. Tepper's Triggerplant occurs in the understorey.

The conservation park is classified as an IUCN Category III protected area.

See also
Protected areas of South Australia

References

External links
Mount Taylor Conservation Park webpage on protected planet

Protected areas of Kangaroo Island
Conservation parks of South Australia
1970 establishments in Australia
Protected areas established in 1970